Lu AA-33810 is a drug developed by Lundbeck, which acts as a potent and highly selective antagonist for the Neuropeptide Y receptor Y5, with a Ki of 1.5nM and around 3300x selectivity over the related Y1, Y2 and Y4 receptors. In animal studies it produced anorectic, antidepressant and anxiolytic effects, and further research is now being conducted into its possible medical application in the treatment of eating disorders.

References 

Neuropeptide Y antagonists
Experimental drugs